Mostek was a manufacturer of integrated circuits.

Mostek may also refer to:
Mostek (Trutnov District), a village and municipality in the Czech Republic
Mostek (Ústí nad Orlicí District), a village and municipality in the Czech Republic
Mostek, Lesser Poland Voivodeship, a village in southern Poland
Mostek, Podlaskie Voivodeship, a village in north-eastern Poland
Mostek, Warmian-Masurian Voivodeship, a settlement in northern Poland

See also
MOS Technology
Mustek Systems